Tomomi Matsuo (born 15 August 1968) is a Japanese badminton player. She competed in women's doubles with team mate Kyoko Sasage at the 1992 Summer Olympics in Barcelona. She competed in women's doubles with team mate Masako Sakamoto at the 1996 Summer Olympics in Atlanta.

References

External links

1968 births
Living people
Japanese female badminton players
Olympic badminton players of Japan
Badminton players at the 1992 Summer Olympics
Badminton players at the 1996 Summer Olympics
Asian Games medalists in badminton
Badminton players at the 1990 Asian Games
Badminton players at the 1994 Asian Games
Asian Games bronze medalists for Japan
Medalists at the 1990 Asian Games
Medalists at the 1994 Asian Games